Nikolayevka is a rural locality (a selo) and the administrative centre of Nikolayevsky Selsoviet, Blagoveshchensky District, Bashkortostan, Russia. The population was 668 as of 2010. There are 2 streets.

Geography 
Nikolayevka is located 9 km northwest of Blagoveshchensk (the district's administrative centre) by road. Dmitriyevka is the nearest rural locality.

References 

Rural localities in Blagoveshchensky District